Eyer Peak is the peak rising to  in Probuda Ridge, north-central Sentinel Range in Ellsworth Mountains, Antarctica. First ascent by the Australian-Chilean team of Damien Gildea on 31 December 2006.

The peak is named after the Swiss Bulgarian pedagogue Louis-Emil Eyer (1865-1916), founder of the sports movement in Bulgaria.

Location
US mapping in 1961, updated in 1988.

See also
 Mountains in Antarctica

Maps
 Vinson Massif.  Scale 1:250 000 topographic map.  Reston, Virginia: US Geological Survey, 1988.
 Antarctic Digital Database (ADD). Scale 1:250000 topographic map of Antarctica. Scientific Committee on Antarctic Research (SCAR). Since 1993, regularly updated.

References
 Bulgarian Antarctic Gazetteer. Antarctic Place-names Commission. (details in Bulgarian, basic data in English)
 Eyer Peak. SCAR Composite Gazetteer of Antarctica.

External links 
 Eyer Peak. Adjusted Copernix satellite image

Bulgaria and the Antarctic
Ellsworth Mountains
Mountains of Ellsworth Land